Not Yet may refer to:

 Madadayo (English:Not Yet), a 1993 Japanese film by Akira Kurosawa
 Not Yet (Art Blakey album), 1988
 Not Yet (Monotonix album), 2011
 Not Yet (band), a sub-unit of the all-female Japanese pop group AKB48
 "Not Yet" (song), a song by Ayumi Hamasaki from Secret
 "Not Yet", song by Jenn Bostic
 "Not Yet", an episode of One Day at a Time (2017 TV series)